The England Boxing National Amateur Championships Light-Middleweight Championship formerly known as the ABA Championships is the primary English amateur boxing championship. It had previously been contested by all the nations of the United Kingdom.

History
The light-middleweight division was inaugurated in 1951 but was not contested from 2005 to 2009 and from 2014 to 2021 following a re-organisation of weight categories in 2010 and 2014 respectively. Yet another weight re-organisation in 2022 resulted in the category returning as an under 71 Kg division. The championships are highly regarded in the boxing world and seen as the most prestigious national amateur championships.

Past winners

References 

England Boxing